Kevin Peterson may refer to:

Kevin Peterson (born 1994), American football player
Kevin Peterson, character in Abandoned (film)
Kevin Peterson, presenter on WFIS (AM)
Misspelling of Kevin Pietersen, cricketer